Prosser House is a historic home located at Indianapolis, Indiana.  It was built about 1885, and is a small -story, stuccoed frame dwelling with applied decoration in cast concrete. It has a cross-gable roof with five dormers. The interior features elaborate plaster work.

It was listed on the National Register of Historic Places in 1975.

References

Houses on the National Register of Historic Places in Indiana
Houses completed in 1885
Houses in Indianapolis
National Register of Historic Places in Indianapolis